Kamathis are a group of people from Mumbai, India who had migrated to the city from the Indian state of Hyderabad state. In 1795, the Maratha army defeated the Nizam of Hyderabad. Following this, many artisans and construction workers from Telangana migrated to Bombay and settled into the flats which were made livable by the construction of the Hornby Vellard. These workers where called Kamathis, and their enclave was called Kamathipura.

References

External links
The First Maratha War
The Inner City

History of Mumbai